Galaktika was a science fiction magazine of Hungary, published between 1972  and 1995. At its peak 94,000 copies were printed in Hungary. For comparison, Analog magazine printed 120,000 copies in the United States.

A newer publication with the same name has been in publication since 2004. There have been reports of translating and publishing works without obtaining the permission of the authors and without paying them.

The original Galaktika (1972–1995) 
The magazine was divided into selections: "thematic", "national" and "mixed". The first section type concentrated on stories with similar themes. The second selected from the literature of a specific country. It was the only possibility for many Hungarian and Eastern-European authors to get their short stories printed.printed. 

Péter Kuczka was the editor for the lifetime of the magazine. The magazine shut down when it was no longer possible to publish Galaktika profitably. There is an active market for its old, rare issues.

The numbering started with 1 in the summer of 1972 with 38,000 copies on 125 A5 pages. After issue #60 the format changed to the larger A4 format of 96 pages in 1985, then back to the A5 in a black bordered format in 1993 which persisted until publication ceased.

Galaktika folded in 1995. During its publication, 2,257 short novels and articles by more than 1,000 authors were published.

The new Galaktika (2004–present) 
The publishing of a new publication also called Galaktika began in November 2004, with issue #176, with a completely new page layout and editorial structure and ownership. The publisher of the new magazine is Metropolis Media.

References

External links
 
 The Galaktika bibliography and database

See also
 Hungarian science fiction

1972 establishments in Hungary
1995 disestablishments in Hungary
2004 establishments in Hungary
Science fiction magazines established in the 1970s
Hungarian-language magazines
Literary magazines published in Hungary
Science fiction magazines
Magazines established in 1972
Magazines disestablished in 1995
Magazines established in 2004
Hungarian science fiction
Magazines published in Budapest
Monthly magazines